Odontostomus is a genus of air-breathing land snail, a terrestrial pulmonate gastropod mollusk in the family Odontostomidae.

Odontostomus is the type genus for the tribe Odontostomini.

Distribution 
This genus of snails occurs in Brazil.

Species 
Species in the genus Odontostomus include:
 Odontostomus dautzenbergianus Pilsbry, 1898
 Odontostomus degeneratus Pilsbry, 1899
 Odontostomus fasciatus (Pfeiffer, 1869)
 Odontostomus gargantuus (Rang, 1831)
 Odontostomus gemellatus Ancey, 1901
 Odontostomus grayanus (Pfeiffer, 1845)
 Odontostomus königswaldi (Thiele, 1906)
 Odontostomus leucotremus (Beck, 1837)
 Odontostomus odontostomus (Sowerby, 1824)
 Odontostomus paulistus Pilsbry & Ihering, 1898
 Odontostomus sexdentatus (Spix, 1827)
 Odontostomus simplex (Thiele, 1906)
 Odontostomus squarrosus Ancey, 1904
 Odontostomus thielei (Pilsbry, 1930)

References

Further reading 
 Baker, H.B. 1947. Odontostomus odontostomus and Cyclodontina pantagruelina. The Nautilus 60: 106.
 Pilsbry, H.A. 1898. Notes on the genus Odontostomus. The Nautilus, Philadelphia, 12: 57-58.
 Pilsbry, H.A. 1898-1899. New species of Odontostomus from Brazil and Argentina. Proceedingss of the Academy of Natural Sciences of Philadelphia, 50: 471-472, 473-474 (1899).

Odontostomidae
Taxa named by John Edward Gray